HSwMS Springaren (Sp), was the sixth boat of the Draken-class submarine of the Swedish Navy.

Construction and career 
HSwMS Springaren was launched on 31 August 1961 by Saab Kockums, Malmö and commissioned on 7 November 1962.

On September 24, 1980, Springaren was extremely close to colliding with an unknown submarine east of Huvudskär. During an exercise, she operated together with one of the Navy's anti-submarine helicopters. The hydrophone operator on Springaren reads a hydrophone effect. It sounds like a rattling moped at high speed. The connecting helicopters also detect the visitor, and immediately classify it as a submarine. The incident was followed by a two-week submarine hunt.

She was decommissioned on 1 October 1987 and later scrapped in Muskö in 1999.

Gallery

References 

Draken-class submarines
Ships built in Malmö
1961 ships